Mal Waldron was a jazz pianist and composer. His appearances on record date from 1952 to 2002 and include more than 100 albums under his own name and more than 80 as a sideman. His writing for film soundtracks is also listed on this page.

Discography

As leader/co-leader

Albums as sideman

Singles as sideman

Soundtracks as composer

References

External links
 Chronological list of Mal Waldron records
 Mal Waldron discography by session

Jazz discographies
Discographies of American artists